Rolls-Royce Baby is a 1975 Swiss sexploitation film written and directed by Erwin C. Dietrich. Dietrich claimed years later in interviews that Jesus Franco co-directed this film, but no reliable sources include this film in Franco's filmography, He merely loaned his leading lady to his producer Dietrich on this one occasion.

Plot
Lina Romay stars as Lisa, a nymphomaniac actress/model who travels the countryside in a Rolls-Royce seeking to pick up hitchhikers and truck drivers for sex. Her driver Erik acts as her chauffeur on these nocturnal expeditions. The film contains graphic nudity, including a scene in which Romay shaves her pubic area in close-up, and participates in oral sex onscreen.

Cast
 Lina Romay as	Lisa
 Eric Falk as Eric
 Ursula Schäfer as Pick-up Girl
 Kurt Meinicke as Photographer
 Roman Hüber as Truck Driver
 Marcel Imbach
 Jonas Ohlin
 Lothar Blumhagen (voice only)
 Alexander Blazzoni

References

External links
 
 Rolls-Royce Baby at Blu-ray.com

1975 films
Swiss comedy films
1970s German-language films
Films directed by Erwin C. Dietrich
Films directed by Jesús Franco
Sexploitation films
Swiss pornographic films